Antezana de la Ribera is a village in the municipality of Ribera Alta in Álava, Basque Country, Spain.

Location and access
Antezana de la Ribera is located on the eastern slope of Montemayor, 29 kilometers from Vitoria on the A-3310 between Manzanos and Pobes.

Population
Antezana de la Ribera consists of 11 inhabitants who live continuously and another six that visit on weekends. Its main activity is agriculture (5 farmers), others work in industries in Vitoria and Miranda de Ebro and the rest are retired.

Geography
The large hill that forms most of Antezana de la Ribera's jurisdiction of 575 hectares consists of pines and holm oaks dotted with oak trees.

Monuments
Antezana de la Ribera has a well-preserved church dedicated to Our Lady of the Assumption whose feast is celebrated on August 15. The altar is flanked by some newly restored paintings. The entrance to the San Andrés chapel is guarded by an elegant gate dating from 1576. There is also a confessional. The pilgrimage to the shrine of Our Lady of Joy is celebrated in May and September. The shrine is located in the upper part of the town from where the views of the valley are splendid. Up to ten other villages belonging to the municipality and the County of Treviño can be seen.

Populated places in Álava